Yuri Romanò (born 26 July 1997) is an Italian volleyball player who won 2021 European Championship and 2022 FIVB Volleyball Men's World Championship.

Honours

Clubs
 National championships
 2022/2023  Italian Cup, with Gas Sales Bluenergy Piacenza

References

External links
 

1997 births
Living people
Italian men's volleyball players
Sportspeople from Monza
Universiade medalists in volleyball
Universiade gold medalists for Italy
Medalists at the 2019 Summer Universiade